The black-eared seedeater (Crithagra mennelli) is a species of finch in the family Fringillidae.
It is found in Angola, Botswana, Democratic Republic of the Congo, Malawi, Mozambique, Namibia, South Africa, Tanzania, Zambia, and Zimbabwe.
Its natural habitats are subtropical or tropical dry forest and dry savanna.

The black-eared seedeater was formerly placed in the genus Serinus but phylogenetic analysis using mitochondrial and nuclear DNA sequences found that the genus was polyphyletic. The genus was therefore split and a number of species including the black-eared seedeater were moved to the resurrected genus Crithagra.

References

External links
 Black-eared seedeater = Blackeared Canary - Species text in The Atlas of Southern African Birds.

black-eared seedeater
Birds of Southern Africa
black-eared seedeater
Taxonomy articles created by Polbot